Cochylimorpha sparsana is a species of moth of the family Tortricidae. It is found in Spain, Italy, Ukraine and Asia Minor.

The wingspan is 17–19 mm. Adults have been recorded on wing in March and from May to June.

References

Moths described in 1880
Cochylimorpha
Moths of Europe
Moths of Asia